Governorates-General (general-gubernatorstvo) were a type of administrative-territorial division in the Russian Empire from 1775–1917. Governorates-General usually comprised a set of guberniyas and oblasts. The term was sometimes used to refer to krais or military guberniyas. The Moscow and Saint-Petersburg governorates were placed into a separate governorate-general.

Description
Governorates-General were governed by governors-general, military leaders of a territory. Governors-General supervised governors, but did not directly participate in the administration of their subordinated guberniyas, except for Moscow and Saint-Petersburg.

List of Governorates-General
 Governorate-General of Saint-Petersburg
 Governorate-General of Moscow
 Governorate-General of Azov
 Belorussian Governorate-General (1775–1856)
 Siberian Governorate-General (1802–1822)
 East-Siberian Governorate-General (1822–1884), split
 Vladivostok Military Guberniya (April 28 – June 9, 1880) (Eugénie de Montijo Archipelago and Muravyov-Amursky Peninsula, established out of the Littoral Oblast right after the "Amur Annexation" turning Vladivostok into city-port. 
 Amur Governorate-General (1887–1917)
 Governorate-General of Irkutsk (1887–1917)
 West-Siberian Governorate-General (1822–1882)
 Lithuanian Governorate-General (1794–1912)
 Governorate-General of Kiev (1832–1912), also known as the Southwestern Krai (Right-bank Ukraine)
 Governorate-General of Grodno, Minsk, Kovno
 Little-Russian Governorate-General (1802–1856)
 Novorossiysk-Bessarabia Governorate-General (1802–1873)
 Governorate-General of Orenburg (1851–1881)
 General Government of Galicia and Bukovina
 Baltic General Governorate
 Vistula Krai, later as Warsaw Governorate-General (1874–1917)
 Russian Turkestan
 Governor-Generalship of the Steppes
 Caucasus Viceroyalty (1801–1917)
 Grand Duchy of Finland, also known as the General Government of Finland

See also
 History of the administrative division of Russia
 Guberniya / List of governorates of the Russian Empire

Notes

References

External links
 Boris Mezhuyev Governorate-General in system of local government of Russia Copyright © 2007 «Русский архипелаг».